Hungarian Wrestling Federation (MBSZ) is the governing body for wrestling in Hungary. It aims to govern, encourage and develop the sport for all throughout the country.

TGF has been established on 16 March 1921, and is headquartered in Budapest. TGF is a member of United World Wrestling (UWW), formerly known as the International Federation of Associated Wrestling Styles (FILA).

The federation organizes the national wrestling events, and European and World championships hosted by Hungary.

International competitions in Hungary
World Championships:
1958 World Wrestling Championships (Greco-Roman) – Budapest
1985 World Wrestling Championships (Freestyle) – Budapest
1986 World Wrestling Championships (Freestyle) – Budapest
1986 World Wrestling Championships (Greco-Roman) – Budapest
2005 World Wrestling Championships – Budapest
2013 World Wrestling Championships – Budapest
2016 World Wrestling Championships – Budapest
2018 World Wrestling Championships – Budapest

European Championships:
1911 European Wrestling Championships – Budapest
1927 European Wrestling Championships – Budapest
1931 European Wrestling Championships (Freestyle) – Budapest
1983 European Wrestling Championships – Budapest
1992 European Wrestling Championships (Freestyle) – Kaposvár
1996 European Wrestling Championships – Budapest
2000 European Wrestling Championships (Freestyle) – Budapest
2001 European Wrestling Championships (Freestyle) – Budapest

International achievements

Olympic Games
Accurate as of the conclusion of the 2020 Olympic Games.

Notable wrestlers

Greco-Roman

Freestyle
Men's

Women's
Marianna Sastin (born 1983), World champion

References

External links
Magyar Birkózó Szövetség (official website)

Hungary
Federation
Wrestling
1927 establishments in Hungary
Sports organizations established in 1927